Ulf Hoelscher (born 17 January 1942 in Kitzingen) is a German violinist.

He has been soloist with the Berlin Philharmonic, the Vienna Symphony, the BBC Symphony Orchestra and the New York Philharmonic. He has recorded numerous concertos by Schoeck, Beethoven, Berg, Bruch, Schumann, Spohr, Saint-Saëns, and Tchaikovsky.

He teaches violin at the Musikhochschule Karlsruhe and the Accademia di Cervo in Italy.

He plays an 18th-century Guarneri violin.

Selected recordings 

 Camille Saint-Saëns, Complete Violin Concertos (n°1, n°2, n°3), Ulf Hoelscher, violin, New Philharmonia Orchestra, conductor Pierre Dervaux. Recorded 1977 for EMI, reissued by Brillant Classics 2012

References 

1942 births
Living people
People from Kitzingen
German classical violinists
Male classical violinists
German male violinists
Academic staff of the Hochschule für Musik Karlsruhe
21st-century classical violinists
21st-century German male musicians